The Toxopeus' yellow tiger (Parantica toxopei) is a species of nymphalid butterfly in the Danainae family. It is endemic to Sulawesi, Indonesia.

References

Parantica
Butterflies of Indonesia
Endemic fauna of Indonesia
Fauna of Sulawesi
Taxonomy articles created by Polbot
Butterflies described in 1969